The 1997 World Junior Ice Hockey Championships were held in Geneva and Morges, Switzerland. The tournament was won by Canada, who won their record fifth-straight gold medal with a 2–0 victory over the United States in the gold-medal match. Mike York of the United States was the top scorer in the tournament, with five goals and five assists for ten points.

The tournament all-star team selected upon the conclusion of the tournament included forwards Mike York (United States), Sergei Samsonov (Russia) and Christian Dube (Canada); defencemen Mark Streit (Switzerland) and Chris Phillips (Canada); and goaltender Brian Boucher (United States).

Notable future National Hockey League (NHL) stars that played in this year's tournament included Joe Thornton (Canada), Daniel Brière (Canada) and Marián Hossa (Slovakia).

Round robin

Group A

Group B

Relegation round

 was relegated for the 1998 World Junior Championships.

Medal Rounds

Quarterfinals

Semifinals

5th-place game

Bronze-medal game

Gold-medal game

Final standings

 was relegated for the 1998 World Juniors

Scoring leaders

Goaltending leaders
(minimum 40% team's total ice time)

Tournament awards

Pool B
This tournament was played in Kyiv Ukraine, from December 27 to January 5.

Standings

Pool C
Played in Gheorgheni and Miercurea Ciuc, Romania from December 30 to January 3.

Preliminary round
Group A

Group B

Placement Games
7th place: 5 - 3 
5th place: 3 - 1 
3rd place: 5 - 4 
1st Place: 8 - 2 

Pool D
Played in Sofia Bulgaria from December 30 to January 3.

Preliminary round
Group A

Group B

Placement Games
7th place: 5 - 3 
5th place: 7 - 3 
3rd place: 4 - 1 
1st Place: 8 - 4 

 was promoted to Pool C for 1998.

References

External links
1997 World Junior Hockey Championships at TSN.ca
Complete details in French at Passionhockey.com

World Junior Ice Hockey Championships
I
I
World Junior Ice Hockey Championships
World Junior Ice Hockey Championships
Sports competitions in Geneva
20th century in Geneva
Morges
Sports competitions in Kyiv
1990s in Kyiv
International ice hockey competitions hosted by Ukraine
World Junior Championships
World Junior Championships
Sports competitions in Sofia
1990s in Sofia
International ice hockey competitions hosted by Bulgaria
Miercurea Ciuc
International ice hockey competitions hosted by Romania
World Junior Championships